The Cordillera Carabaya (Spanish for "Carabaya mountain range") lies in the Andes of Peru. It extends between 14°00' and 14°22'S and 69°38' and 70°19'W for about 75 km. It is located in the Puno Region, Carabaya Province, between the Vilcanota mountain range in the north-west and the Apolobamba mountain range in the south-east, north and north-east of Macusani.

Mountains 
Other mountains are listed below:

See also 
 Chaupicocha
 Kallawaya

References

Mountain ranges of Peru
Mountain ranges of Puno Region